= El Eco Obrero (Sucre, 1887) =

- Editor: José Santos Sea
- Founded: 1887
- Ceased publication: 1917
- Language: Spanish language
- Headquarters: Sucre

El Eco Obrero ('The Workers Echo') was a workers publication published from Sucre, Bolivia. The publication was founded in 1887, and was the organ of the Workers Mutual Aid Society of the Capital. José Santos Sea was the director of El Eco Obrero.
